Bryant Keith Ortego (August 30, 1963 – March 2, 2022) was an American football wide receiver for the Chicago Bears of the NFL.  He was a member of the Bears team that won Super Bowl XX following the 1985 NFL season.  He was also a member of the "Shuffling Crew" in the video The Super Bowl Shuffle.

Ortego attended McNeese State University. He died on March 2, 2022, at the age of 58.

References

1963 births
2022 deaths
American football wide receivers
McNeese Cowboys football players
Chicago Bears players
People from Eunice, Louisiana
Players of American football from Louisiana